Andrey Shkiotov (sometimes listed as Andrey Shkyotov, born July 25, 1986) is a Russian sprint canoer who competed in the mid-2000s. At the 2004 Summer Olympics in Athens, he was eliminated in the semifinals of both the K-1 500 m and K-1 1000 m events.

References
Sports-Reference.com profile

1986 births
Canoeists at the 2004 Summer Olympics
Living people
Olympic canoeists of Russia
Russian male canoeists